The Amstrad CP/M Plus character set (alternatively known as PCW character set or ZX Spectrum +3 character set) is any of a group of 8-bit character sets introduced by Amstrad/Locomotive Software for use in conjunction with their adaptation of Digital Research's CP/M Plus on various Amstrad CPC / Schneider CPC and Amstrad PCW / Schneider Joyce machines. The character set was also used on the Amstrad ZX Spectrum +3 version of CP/M.

At least on the ZX Spectrum +3 it existed in eight language-specific variants (based on ISO/IEC 646) depending on the selected locale of the system: USA (default), France, Germany,  UK, Denmark, Sweden, Italy and Spain.

Another slight variant of the character set was used by LocoScript.

Character set

Language variants 

In languages 1 to 7, certain characters in the range 0..127 are swapped with characters in the range 128..255 of the character set, as shown in the following table:

See also 
Amstrad CPC character set
 ZX Spectrum character set
 ISO/IEC 646 (similar, but not identical set of 7-bit character sets)
 Box-drawing character

References

Further reading

 http://www.cpcwiki.eu/index.php/Amstrad/Schneider_Printer_Character_Sets
 http://www.cpcwiki.eu/index.php/Keyboard_Versions#Character_Set_ROMs

Character sets
CP/M technology
ZX Spectrum